USS Clara Dolsen was a large steamer captured by the Union Navy during the American Civil War. She served the Union Navy in river operations and as a "receiving ship" auxiliary.

Service history

Clara Dolsen, a side-wheel steamer, was captured 14 June 1862 by the gunboat  and the tug  on the White River during the St. Charles expedition. After taking part in the joint Army-Navy expedition to recapture Henderson, Kentucky, (19–24 July 1862), she served as a receiving ship at Cairo, Illinois, until April 1864. Since she had not been labeled as a prize, her owners brought suit for her return. The final adjudication restored Clara Dolsen to her owners, and she was turned over to the U.S. Marshal for the Southern District of Illinois in May 1864, for delivery to her owners.

References 

Ships of the Union Navy
Steamships of the United States Navy
American Civil War auxiliary ships of the United States